The , officially the , is Japanese funicular line that climbs  in Kawanishi, Hyōgo. It is operated by Nose Electric Railway. The Kabu Line reopened in 1960 as Myoken Cable, while the Jōbu Line became a chairlift.

Basic data
Distance: 
Gauge: 
Vertical interval:

Stations

See also
List of funicular railways
List of railway lines in Japan

External links 
 

Funicular railways in Japan
Rail transport in Hyōgo Prefecture
Standard gauge railways in Japan
Railway lines opened in 1925
Railway lines closed in 1944
Railway lines opened in 1960
Japanese companies established in 1925